Thenkarai is a suburban area near Coimbatore City Municipal Corporation, in the Indian state of Tamil Nadu. It is in the western suburbs of Coimbatore. It recently merged with the Coimbatore Corporation limits. Thenkarai is one of the town panchayats in Coimbatore and consists of small villages such as Sennanur, Mathipalayam, Karadimadai, Thaneer Panthal, Appachimaar Kovil, Challikkuzhi and KrishnaPuram Pudur.

Name
Thenkarai is a scenic village situated in Coimbatore, India.  This place is approximately 17 km away from center of Coimbatore City and on the way to Siruvani Dam. The village is under the foothills of western ghats. The major occupation among the people is agriculture and agriculture-related works. But, the new generations are very much interested in all kinds of jobs. Tamil is the main language spoken in this region. Kannada and Telugu is also spoken by the people who settled here after the fall of the Vijayanagara Empire in Karnataka. English is widely understood by the younger generation in this village. This village is well connected to Coimbatore's headquarters by bus services.

Places
Each of the villages in Thenkarai have popular landmarks. The famous landmark is Government High Secondary School, Sennanur, which is very famous among the government schools in the area. There is an orphanage home near the village Mathipalayam which is taking care of many abandoned senior citizens. The village is well connected by road to the main city Coimbatore. There are government-run hospital facilities, and a post office is available in Sennanur. People in these villages gather at temples of Amman, Perumal, Vinayagar which are quite famous during the festival times.

Demographics
 India census, Thenkarai had a population of 7168. Males constitute 50% of the population and females 50%. Thenkarai has an average literacy rate of 53%, lower than the national average of 59.5%: male literacy is 64%, and female literacy is 43%. In Thenkarai, 9% of the population is under 6 years of age.

Attractions Nearby
Velliangiri Mountains, Kovai Kutralam, Siruvani Dam, Marudamalai, Isha Foundation, Vaideki Falls, Patteeshwarar Temple

References

Cities and towns in Coimbatore district
Suburbs of Coimbatore